Megaoonops is a genus of goblin spiders first described by Michael Saaristo in 2007. , it contains only one species, Megaoonops avrona.

References

Oonopidae
Monotypic Araneomorphae genera
Spiders of Asia